Prineville Reservoir Wildlife Area  is a wildlife area near Prineville, Oregon. It is administered by the Oregon Department of Fish and Wildlife. It also borders Prineville Reservoir State Park. Wildlife visible includes bald eagles, golden eagles, mule deer, and osprey. Fish include largemouth bass, rainbow trout, and smallmouth bass.

References

External links

Protected areas of Crook County, Oregon
Oregon state wildlife areas